Shahid Chamran (also Romanized as Shahīd Chamrān) is a village in Esmailabad Rural District, in the Central District of Khash County, Sistan and Baluchestan Province, Iran. At the 2006 census, its population was 71, in 20 families.

References 

Populated places in Khash County